Kononovo may refer to:
 Kononovo, Perm Krai, a Russian village in the Dobryansky District
 Kononovo, Vashkinsky District, Vologda Oblast, a Russian village in the Andreyevskoye Rural Settlement
 Kononovo, Vladimir Oblast, a Russian village in the Melenkovsky District
 Kononovo, Ustyuzhensky District, Vologda Oblast, a Russian village in the Soshnevskoye Rural Settlement